"Se a vida é (That's the Way Life Is)" is a song by English synth-pop duo Pet Shop Boys, released on 12 August 1996 as the second single from their sixth studio album, Bilingual (1996). The single was one of the most widely played records on UK radio in 1996 and stayed on the UK Singles Chart for almost two months peaking at number eight. It also reached the top five in Czech Republic, Finland, Hungary and Spain, and the top 10 in Denmark. Curiously, despite the Portuguese title, it was not a hit in Portugal, nor in the other major Lusophone country, Brazil.

In the United States, the single was released on 1 April 1997 by Atlantic Records as a double A-side with "To Step Aside". Thirteen mixes of the track were commissioned and spread over various formats, several of them promotional-only. "To Step Aside" reached number one on Billboards Hot Dance Music/Club Play chart and number eight on the Hot Dance Music/Maxi-Singles Sales chart. 

The song is based on "Estrada Da Paixão" by African-Brazilian band Olodum, which was supporting Pet Shop Boys on the South American leg of their Discovery tour in 1994. The band shares songwriting credits with Pet Shop Boys.

Critical reception
Ross Jones from The Guardian described "Se a vida é (That's the Way Life Is)" as "a sexy and vibrant song", and a "life-affirming lambada". He added that "it's still one of the freshest, most joyous things you've ever heard." Music Week rated it five out of five, picking it as Single of the Week. The reviewer wrote, "Superlatives aren't enough for the best Pet Shop Boys single in years. Justice demands it be the biggest of summer hits." The magazine's Alan Jones commented, "Neil Tennant's melancholic voice is usually lost in a swirl of synths, but the Pet Shop Boys' upcoming single (...) is a delightful change of style. An extremely commercial and very positive song, it features a four-piece brass section, a guitar and 20 female drummers. The latter's inclusion gives a sometimes thunderous rumble to appropriate sections of the song, but the rest is very lightweight and breezy, with a vaguely Latin flavour floating in with the brass section. Another Top 10 hit."

Music video
The accompanying music video for "Se a vida é (That's the Way Life Is)" was shot at the Wet 'n Wild water theme park in Orlando, Florida, and features actress Eva Mendes in a small role as a teenager with her friends at the park. The video, directed by Bruce Weber, entered heavy rotation on MTV and VH1 that summer.

Translation
The correct English translation of "Se a vida é" from Portuguese is actually "If Life Is...". ("That's the way life is" would be "É assim que a vida é..." or "A vida é assim".) The other Portuguese lyric is "Essa vida é..." ("This life is..."), which sounds very similar to "Se a vida é".

Track listings

 UK and Australian CD1
 "Se a vida é (That's the Way Life Is)" – 4:01
 "Betrayed" – 5:18
 "How I Learned to Hate Rock 'n' Roll" – 4:40
 "Se a vida é (That's the Way Life Is)" (Pink Noise mix) – 5:27

 UK and Australian CD2
 "Se a vida é (That's the Way Life Is)" (Mark Picchiotti's Deep and Dark vocal) – 7:58
 "Se a vida é (That's the Way Life Is)" (Mark Picchiotti's Shelter dub) – 8:40
 "Se a vida é (That's the Way Life Is)" (Deep Dish Liquid remix) – 9:57
 "Se a vida é (That's the Way Life Is)" (Deep Dish dub) – 11:46

 UK cassette single and European CD single
 "Se a vida é (That's the Way Life Is)" – 4:01
 "Betrayed" – 5:17

 Japanese mini-CD single
 "Se a vida é (That's the Way Life Is)"
 "Go West"

US CD single
 "Se a vida é (That's the Way Life Is)" (album version) – 4:01
 "Se a vida é (That's the Way Life Is)" (Mark Picchiotti's Deep and Dark vocal) – 7:58
 "To Step Aside" (album version) – 3:48
 "To Step Aside" (Ralphie's disco vox) – 9:07
 "The Calm Before the Storm" – 2:45
 "Betrayed" – 5:32

US 2×12-inch single
 "Se a vida é (That's the Way Life Is)" (Mark Picchiotti's Deep and Dark vocal) – 7:58
 "Se a vida é (That's the Way Life Is)" (Deep Dish Liquid remix) – 9:57
 "To Step Aside" (Ralphie's disco vox) – 9:07
 "To Step Aside" (Hasbrouck Heights mix) – 8:50
 "To Step Aside" (Davidson Ospina dub) – 7:30
 "To Step Aside" (Ralphie's Old School dub) – 7:33
 "To Step Aside" (Brutal Bill mix) – 7:50
 "To Step Aside" (Ralphi's house vox II) – 7:32

Personnel
Personnel are adapted from the Bilingual album booklet.

 Pet Shop Boys – production
 Neil Tennant – words, music
 Chris Lowe – music
 Ademario – music
 Wellington Epiderme Negra – music
 Nego do Barbalho – music
 J.J. Belle – guitar
 Mike Innes – brass

 Noel Langley – brass
 Richard Sidwell – brass
 Andy Hamilton – brass
 SheBoom – additional drums and percussion
 Chris Porter – production, recording, mixing
 Bob Kraushaar – recording (SheBoom)
 Pete Gleadall – programming

Charts

Weekly charts

Year-end charts

References

1996 singles
1996 songs
Parlophone singles
Pet Shop Boys songs
Songs written by Chris Lowe
Songs written by Neil Tennant